In Greek mythology, Pyreneus was a king of Thrace.

Mythology 
In Ovid's Metamorphoses, Pyreneus invites the Muses to take shelter in his palace while he secretly means to do them harm. Once the Muses are inside, he tries to trap them, but they fly away. He tries to follow them by leaping off a tower, but only falls to his death.

Note

References 

 Publius Ovidius Naso, Metamorphoses translated by Brookes More (1859-1942). Boston, Cornhill Publishing Co. 1922. Online version at the Perseus Digital Library.
 Publius Ovidius Naso, Metamorphoses. Hugo Magnus. Gotha (Germany). Friedr. Andr. Perthes. 1892. Latin text available at the Perseus Digital Library.

Accidental deaths from falls

Characters in Greek mythology